The Benevolent Cupid is a ballet in one act, with libretto and choreography by Marius Petipa and music by Cesare Pugni, first presented by students of the Imperial Ballet School on the stage of the school's theatre, on March 6/18 (Julian/Gregorian calendar dates), 1868, in St. Petersburg, Russia.

References

External links

Ballets by Marius Petipa
Ballets by Cesare Pugni
1868 ballet premieres